Piñeiro is a town in Avellaneda Partido of Buenos Aires Province, Argentina. It forms part of the urban agglomeration of Greater Buenos Aires.

Notes and references

Populated places in Buenos Aires Province
Populated places established in 1893
Avellaneda Partido